Gladeview is a census-designated place (CDP) in Miami-Dade County, Florida, United States. The population was 14,927 at the 2020 census, up from 11,535 in 2010.

Gladeview was originally a neighborhood of the city of Miami when it was annexed in 1925. With the arrival of the Great Depression, Miami gave up its jurisdiction and Gladeview became an unincorporated area of Miami-Dade County.

Geography
Gladeview is bordered by Brownsville to the south, the Miami neighborhood of Liberty City to the east, and West Little River to the north. The city of Hialeah is located to the west of Gladeview.

Demographics

2020 census

Note: the US Census treats Hispanic/Latino as an ethnic category. This table excludes Latinos from the racial categories and assigns them to a separate category. Hispanics/Latinos can be of any race.

2000 Census
As of the census of 2000, there were 14,468 people, 4,359 households, and 3,199 families residing in the CDP. The racial makeup of the CDP was 17.59% White (1.8% were Non-Hispanic White,) 76.98% African American, 0.21% Native American, 0.17% Asian, 0.03% Pacific Islander, 2.48% from other races, and 2.54% from two or more races. Hispanic or Latino of any race were 21.32% of the population.

There were 4,359 households, out of which 39.5% had children under the age of 18 living with them, 25.3% were married couples living together, 40.3% had a female householder with no husband present, and 26.6% were non-families. 21.2% of all households were made up of individuals, and 9.1% had someone living alone who was 65 years of age or older. The average household size was 3.30 and the average family size was 3.88.

In the CDP, the population was spread out, with 38.0% under the age of 18, 10.3% from 18 to 24, 25.9% from 25 to 44, 16.1% from 45 to 64, and 9.8% who were 65 years of age or older. The median age was 26 years. For every 100 females, there were 86.1 males. For every 100 females age 18 and over, there were 77.5 males.

The median income for a household in the CDP was $15,981, and the median income for a family was $17,625. Males had a median income of $20,732 versus $19,923 for females. The per capita income for the CDP was $7,941. About 48.4% of families and 52.8% of the population were below the poverty line, including 65.5% of those under age 18 and 32.7% of those age 65 or over.

As of 2000, speakers of English as a first language accounted for 74.32% of residents while Spanish made up 22.48%, and French Creole was at 2.39%, and French consisted of 0.79% of the population.

Government and infrastructure
The Miami-Dade County Corrections and Rehabilitation Department is headquartered in Gladeview.

The Miami-Dade Fire Rescue operates Station 2 Model Cities in Gladeview.

Education
Miami-Dade County Public Schools operates area public schools:

Elementary schools
Poinciana Park Elementary School
Lillie C Evans Elementary School
Liberty City Elementary School
 Gladeview Christian School

Middle schools
Charles Drew Middle School

High schools
Miami Northwestern Senior High School

Transportation
Gladeview is served by Metrobus throughout the area, the Miami Metrorail, Tri-Rail, and Amtrak:

Metrorail:
  Northside (NW 79th Street and NW 32nd Avenue)
  Dr. Martin Luther King Jr. Plaza (NW 62nd Street and NW 27th Avenue)

Tri-Rail:
  Tri-Rail/Metrorail Transfer (NW 79th Street and NW 37th Avenue)

Amtrak:
  Amtrak-Miami: Silver Star and Silver Meteor service, (NW 79th Street and NW 37th Avenue)

References

Census-designated places in Miami-Dade County, Florida
Census-designated places in Florida